Henry John Heinz (October 11, 1844 – May 14, 1919) was an American entrepreneur of Palatine descent who, at the age of 25, co-founded a small horseradish concern in Sharpsburg, Pennsylvania. This business failed, but his second business expanded into tomato ketchup and other condiments, and ultimately became the internationally known H. J. Heinz Company of Pittsburgh, Pennsylvania.

He was involved in the passage of the 1906 Pure Food and Drug Act. Many of his descendants are known for philanthropy and involvement in politics and public affairs. His fortune became the basis for the Heinz Foundations.

Early life
Henry John Heinz was born in Birmingham, Pennsylvania to John Henry Heinz (1811–1891) and Anna Margaretha Schmidt (1822–1899). John Henry was born Johann Heinrich Heinz to parents Johann Georg and Charlotte Louisa (née Trump) Heinz in Kallstadt of the Palatinate, which at that time was part of the Kingdom of Bavaria. Then when Henry was 5 his parents moved to Sharpsburg where Henry’s father went into the brick making business for himself. Anna Schmidt was the daughter of a farmer and church administrator, Johann Adam Schmidt, and his wife Dorothea (Thiel) Schmidt. (At least one biographer has erroneously written that Anna's father was a pastor, based on a mistranslation of the German word "Kirchenältester" which appears before Anna's father's name in Anna's baptism record. "Kirchenältester" does not mean "pastor," but rather refers to a lay church administrator who is elected by the parish elders to safeguard the affairs of the church.) Anna came from Hesse-Kassel, which was a Reformed Protestant (Calvinist) territory, so she was raised in the Calvinist Christian faith. Anna's husband, John Heinz, was a Lutheran, and they raised and confirmed their son to that faith.

H. J. Heinz Company

Henry John Heinz began packing foodstuffs on a small scale at Sharpsburg, Pennsylvania, in 1869. There, he founded Heinz Noble & Company with a friend, L. Clarence Noble, and started marketing bottled horseradish, soon followed by sauerkraut, vinegar, and pickles. The company went bankrupt in 1875. The following year, Heinz founded another company, F & J Heinz, with his brother John Heinz and a cousin, Frederick Heinz.

The company continued to grow and, in 1888, Heinz bought out his other two partners and reorganized it as the H. J. Heinz Company, the name carried to the present day. The company's slogan, "57 varieties," was introduced by Heinz in 1896; by then, the company was selling more than 60 different products. Heinz said he chose "5" because it was his lucky number; the number "7" was his wife's lucky number.

The H. J. Heinz Company was incorporated in 1905 with Heinz serving as its first president, retaining that position for the rest of his life. At the time of Heinz's death in Pittsburgh at the age of 74, the H. J. Heinz Company had more than 20 food processing plants and owned seed farms and container factories.

Later life
Heinz led a successful lobbying effort in favor of the Pure Food and Drug Act in 1906. During World War I, he worked with the Food Administration. He was a director in many financial institutions, and was chairman of a committee to devise ways of protecting Pittsburgh from floods.

Marriage and family
Heinz married Sarah Sloan Young on September 3, 1869. She was of Scots-Irish ancestry and had grown up in the Presbyterian Church. They had five children:
 Irene Edwilda Heinz-Given (1871–1956)
 Clarence Henry Heinz (1873–1920)
 Howard Covode Heinz (1877–1941)
 Robert Eugene Heinz (1882–1882, lived about 1 month)
 Clifford Sloan Heinz (1883–1935)
They were raised as Presbyterians.

Religious faith

Later in life Heinz worshipped as a member of Methodist and Presbyterian churches, and worked closely with Baptists as well.

When Heinz visited England, his "tourist stops" included the graves of religious leaders John Bunyan, Isaac Watts, and John Wesley. He visited a chapel that Wesley founded, later writing that "I felt I was upon holy ground." At the beginning of his will Heinz wrote: "I desire to set forth, at the very beginning of this Will, as the most important item in it, a confession of my faith in Jesus Christ as my Savior."

Death and legacy
Heinz died at his home on May 14, 1919, after contracting pneumonia. His funeral was at East Liberty Presbyterian Church. He was buried at Homewood Cemetery in Pittsburgh, in the Heinz Family Mausoleum.

A bronze statue of Heinz by Emil Fuchs was dedicated on October 11, 1924, at the Heinz Company building in Pittsburgh.

Heinz is the grandfather of H. J. Heinz II (1908–1987) the great-grandfather of U.S. Senator H. John Heinz III (1938–1991) of Pennsylvania (who was later buried in the same family mausoleum), and great-great grandfather of Henry John Heinz IV, André Thierstein Heinz and Christopher Drake Heinz.

Through his paternal grandmother, Charlotte Louisa Trump, he was a second cousin of Friedrich Trump, second cousin (once removed) of real estate magnate Fred Trump, and second cousin (twice removed) of 45th President of the United States, Donald Trump.

References

Further reading
 "Henry Heinz and Brand Creation in the Late Nineteenth Century: Making Markets for Processed Food" by Nancy Koehn.  The Business History Review, Vol. 73 (Autumn, 1999), pp. 349–393. , reprinted in Koehn, Nancy F. Koehn,  Brand New : How Entrepreneurs Earned Consumers' Trust from Wedgwood to Dell (2001) pp 43–90.

External links

1844 births
1919 deaths
People from Sharpsburg, Pennsylvania
American inventors
American food company founders
Methodists from Pennsylvania
American people of German descent
Heinz family
Heinz people
Burials at Homewood Cemetery
Deaths from pneumonia in Pennsylvania